Kyle John Haynes is an English footballer who plays for Hednesford Town. Haynes was formerly on the books at Cheltenham Town and featured in the Football League for the Robins.

Playing career

Birmingham City
He started his career as a junior at Birmingham City before his release in 2008. He had a trial with Norwich City in February 2008.

Cheltenham Town
After his release from Birmingham City he joined the Cheltenham Town centre of excellence. Kyle progressed to the club's reserve team and made his debut for the club as a substitute in the game against Oldham Athletic on 24 March 2009. In doing so he became the club's youngest Football League player at the age of 17 years 2 months and 26 days old. That season, he went on to become League Two Apprentice of the Year.

In December 2010, he was loaned out to Salisbury City in order to gain first team experience. The loan was extended further in January 2011. After returning to Whaddon Road, he was loaned to Hednesford Town for a month.

At the start of the 2011–12 season, it was reported that Haynes had returned to Salisbury City on a three-month loan deal. This move fell through however and Haynes re-joined Hednesford Town on a three-month loan to play in the Northern Premier League.

Hednesford Town
In November 2011, Haynes and Cheltenham came to an agreement that would see Haynes leave the club to link up permanently with Hednesford following his loan spell at the club.

References

External links

Living people
Footballers from Wolverhampton
English Football League players
Gloucester City A.F.C. players
Association football defenders
Cheltenham Town F.C. players
1991 births
Northern Premier League players
Hednesford Town F.C. players
English footballers